The 1999 World Junior Ice Hockey Championships (1999 WJC) was held in Winnipeg, and five other communities in  Manitoba, Canada from December 26, 1998 to January 5, 1999. In the gold medal match at Winnipeg Arena, Russia defeated Canada 3–2 on Artem Chubarov's overtime goal.  The bronze medal was claimed by Slovakia, giving the six-year-old country its first medal at an IIHF event.

The playoff round reverts to six teams qualifying, with group leaders getting a bye to the semifinals.

Pool A

Group A

Group B

Relegation round

Source:

 was relegated for the 2000 World Juniors

Final round
Source:

Quarterfinals

Semifinals

5th place game

Bronze medal game

Gold medal game

Final standings

Scoring leaders

Goaltending leaders 
(minimum 40% team's total ice time)

Tournament awards

Pool B
The Pool B tournament was played in Székesfehérvár and Dunaújváros, Hungary from December 27, 1998 to January 3, 1999. Two groups of four played round robins, and then the top three played each of the top three teams from the other group. All scores carried forward except the results against the lone eliminated team from each group.

Preliminary round

Group A

Group B

Medal round

 was promoted to Pool A for 2000.

Relegation round
Source:

 lost two games to none and was relegated to Pool C for 2000.

Pool C
The Pool C tournament was played in Kaunas and Elektrėnai, Lithuania from December 30, 1998 to January 3, 1999.

Preliminary round

Group A

Group B

Placement games
Source:

7th place game

 was relegated to Pool D for the 2000 World Junior Ice Hockey Championships.

5th place game

3rd place game

1st place game

 was promoted to Pool B for the 2000 World Junior Ice Hockey Championships.

Pool D
The Pool D tournament was played in Novi Sad, FR Yugoslavia from December 29, 1998 to January 4, 1999.

Group A

Group B

Group C

1st–3rd place group

 was promoted to Pool C for 2000.

4th–6th place group

7th–9th place group

References

External links
Official website of IIHF
1999 World Junior Championship results at the Hockeyarchives.info

International ice hockey competitions hosted by Canada
World
World Junior Championships
World Junior Ice Hockey Championships
World Junior 1999
World Junior Ice Hockey
World Junior Ice Hockey Championships
World Junior Ice Hockey Championships
1990s in Winnipeg
Dunaújváros
World Junior Ice Hockey Championships
International ice hockey competitions hosted by Hungary
Sport in Elektrėnai
Sports competitions in Kaunas
20th century in Kaunas
World Junior Ice Hockey Championships
International ice hockey competitions hosted by Lithuania